Swearnet: The Movie is a 2014 Canadian dark comedy film directed by Warren P. Sonoda, written, produced by and starring Mike Smith, John Paul Tremblay, and Robb Wells, stars of the Canadian television series Trailer Park Boys. In the film, Smith, Tremblay and Wells appear as themselves as they embark on creating a fully uncensored Internet network.

The Guinness World Records website lists the film as holding the record for the most uses of the word "fuck" in a film, with a total of 935 times. It also received the rarely-used NC-17 rating from the MPAA. The film is rated 18 by the British Board of Film Classification.

Plot
Fed up with being censored in their post–Trailer Park Boys lives, the out of work stars/world-renowned "Swearnet", Mike Smith, Robb Wells, and John Paul Tremblay decide to start their own uncensored network on the Internet.

Cast
 Mike Smith as himself
 John Paul Tremblay as himself
 Robb Wells as himself
 Pat Roach as himself/Swearman
 Mishael Morgan as Jamie
 Sarah Jurgens as Julie
 Shannon Leroux as Rachel
 Dana Woods as Logi
 Howard Jerome as Trigger
 Tom Green as himself
 Carrot Top as himself
 Leigh MacInnis as Leigh
 Sebastian Bach as himself
 John Dunsworth as himself

Wells, Tremblay and Smith briefly reprise their roles as Ricky, Julian and Bubbles respectively in the mid-credits scene.

Production
The film was shot between August 20, 2012 and September 12, 2012 in Sault Ste. Marie, Ontario and Halifax, Nova Scotia, using the Arri Alexa digital camera.

Reception 

The film has been met with negative reviews. On Rotten Tomatoes the film has an approval rating of 20% based on 10 reviews, with an average critical rating of 4.6/10. On Metacritic, it holds an 18 out of 100 based on 5 reviews indicating "overwhelming dislike".

See also
 List of films that most frequently use the word "fuck"
 List of NC-17 rated films

References

External links
 
 
 
 
 
 Swearnet at Library and Archives Canada

2014 films
Canadian comedy films
English-language Canadian films
Films shot in Sault Ste. Marie, Ontario
Films shot in Halifax, Nova Scotia
Entertainment One films
Works about profanity
Films directed by Warren P. Sonoda
2010s English-language films
2010s Canadian films